Directorate of Education is an Icelandic governmental institution that provides educational material to students of primary and upper secondary schools in Iceland, supervises the educational system, and conducts standardized testing. It was formed in  when it took over the responsibilities of the National Centre for Educational Materials and the Educational Testing Institute.

References

External links
 Official website 

Education in Iceland
Educational organizations based in Iceland